The All India Pre-Medical test/ Pre-Dental Entrance Test was an annual medical entrance examination in India. About AIPMT</ref> The exam was conducted by the Central Board of Secondary Education (CBSE) but is now replaced by NEET-UG by National Testing Agency.

The exam was a requirement for admission to MBBS and BDS degree programs in several medical colleges across the country. 15% of the total seats in all medical and dental colleges run by the Union of India, state governments, municipal or other local authorities in India, except in the states of Andhra Pradesh, Telangana and Jammu and Kashmir, were reserved for candidates who qualified this examination.

Conduct
The primary aim of this test, which was standardized all over India, was to make medical education available on an equitable basis to all regions of the nation and to foster inter-regional exchange.

Every Year AIPMT was conducted on first Sunday in the month of May.
In 2016, AIPMT/NEET Phase-1 was conducted on 1 May 2016 and NEET Phase-2 was conducted on 24 July 2016.

Timeline How AIPMT is Scrapped -

On 2012 - 
The Medical Council of India (MCI) and Dental Council of India (DCI) conducted NEET for the admissions in UG and PG programmes in government and Private colleges in India. This exam is delayed by a year due to several reasons.

On 18 July 2013 -
NEET Exam is scrapped by the Supreme court in favor of 115 petitions. They also announced that private medical colleges should not conduct their own UG and PG exams on the basis of NEET.

Academic Session 2016-17
On 11 April -
The Supreme court decided to hear the Medical Council of India. On 28 April 2016 the court announced that their will only one common entrance test just before the 2 days of AIPMT which is called as NEET Phase 1 exam.

On 18 April - 
In the session on 2016-17 the SC agreed to hold the NEET in 2 phase. Those candidates who did not appear in the phase 1 exam, AIPMT will be considered as phase 2.

On 1 May -
CBSE conducted NEET phase 1 and almost 6 lakhs of the candidates appeared in the exam.

On 25 May -
The SC cleared all the confusions that private colleges would no longer be conduct their separate exam for medical admissions.

On 9 May - 
The SC rejected the plea filed by the state governments and minority institutions to take the separate entrance exam for MBBS and BDS courses for the current year as well.

On 20 May -
The National Testing Agency came out in order to keep state government exam out of the field of the common test.

On 23 May -
The Delhi govt finally made the decision to make NEET the only exam for the admission to medical colleges.

On 24 May -
President of India finally signed an order the common medical entrance exam on hold for a year.

Exam pattern

Exam changes
In 2010, the pattern of AIPMT was changed. The examination was replaced by a two-tier or two-stage test – The AIPMT Prelims and the AIPMT Mains, in which the AIPMT Prelims was used to be objective exam and AIPMT Mains was used to be subjective exam. The candidates who could qualify the AIPMT Prelims were eligible to give the AIPMT Mains test. Finally, those who scored good in the AIPMT Mains were selected for admission based purely on the merit of the candidate in the AIPMT Mains. Admission was done rank-wise.

In 2013, the pattern changed again - The two-tier examination was replaced by the National Eligibility cum Entrance Test (NEET-UG). It was a nationwide test through which admissions were to be done for all seats of MBBS and BDS in all the colleges which were covered by previous exam.

From 2014 onwards, the exam was named AIPMT again, and done for 15% seats only, as was done earlier to National Eligibility cum Entrance Test (NEET-UG). See current exam pattern below for more details.

Current exam pattern
The exam was conducted in a single stage that usually occurred on the first Sunday of May. now aimpt has cancelled due to the neet examination The examination consisted of one paper containing 180 objective type questions from Physics, Chemistry and Biology (Botany & Zoology), having 45 questions from each subject. The exam duration was 3 hours. Each question carried 4 marks. For each incorrect response, one mark used to be deducted from the total score. However, no deduction from the total score was made if no response was indicated for an item. Indication of more than one answer for a question was deemed an incorrect response and negatively marked.

AIPMT registration over time

The approximate number of registrations in the past two years are shown by the following graph:

Number of Candidates for AIPMT over time
The approximate number of candidates appearing in the past two years are shown by the following graph:

AIPMT participating states and institutions 
In 2015, 9 states and 4 medical institutions participated in AIPMT for filling their MBBS and BDS seats. The list of AIPMT 2015 participating states and institutions are:

Participating states

 Andaman & Nicobar
 Arunachal Pradesh
 Haryana
 Himachal Pradesh
 Maharashtra
 Manipur
 Meghalaya
 Odisha
 Rajasthan
  Tamilnadu
In 2016, 8 states were initially participating in AIPMT but later AIPMT was converted into NEET-UG by the Supreme Court. Subsequently, many other states opted for the test. Bihar, Uttarakhand later opted for the test to fill their state seats in medical colleges.

 Haryana
 Himachal Pradesh
 Madhya Pradesh
 Manipur
 Meghalaya (subject to confirmation)
 Odisha
 Rajasthan
 Chandigarh (UT)

Participating institutes

 Armed Force Medical Services (Armed Forces Medical College (India)) 
 Banaras Hindu University
 Jamia Hamdard University 
 University of Delhi

Reservation

(a) 15% seats are reserved for SC candidates, 
(b) 8% seats are reserved for ST candidates, 
(c) 27% seats are reserved for non-creamy layer OBC candidates

Criticism

AIPMT is criticized for being conducted only in English and Hindi, making it harder for students where vernacular languages such as Bengali, Tamil, Telugu, Kannada, Malayalam, Marathi or Gujarati are more prominent. As an example, in September 2011, the Gujarat High Court acted on Public Interest Litigation by the Gujarati Sahitya Parishad for conducting the exams in Gujarati. A second petition was made in October 2011.

AIPMT 2015, 2016 : The banning of scarfs' controversy   
The AIPMT in 2015 had listed scarfs in banned items' list, creating controversy and outrage especially in the state of Kerala, wherein a nun was refused to appear for the test as she refused to remove her headgear. This comes after the Supreme Court upheld the CBSE's banning. The Kerala HC had permitted two Muslim girls to wear a headscarf and a full-sleeve dress on the condition that they be frisked had the invigilator deemed necessary. However, in the case of Sister Seba, the official had disallowed even while she was ready for any frisking.

The AIPMT kept the same norm in its 2016 instructions, sparking protests by the Campus Front of India in front of the CBSE office in Kerala on 13 April. The subsequent protest led to the detention of several girl protesters. Thus CBSE challenged a Kerala High Court single bench order and granted permission to Muslim girls to wear the Hijab for All India Pre-Medical Test 2016 Justice Muhammed Mushtaq had permitted all candidates who want to wear headscarf and full sleeved length dress to appear for the examination but on a condition that they would be present at the hall half an hour before the exam for frisking, if necessary by women invigilators The order was issued while hearing a petition for changing the dress code

AIPMT 2015 paper leak
In AIPMT 2015 (3 May 2015), Haryana (Rohtak) police caught four people, including two dentists and an MBBS student, from Rohtak for allegedly passing on answer keys of AIPMT 2015 Exam to candidates during the exam, using vests with SIM card units and Bluetooth enabled earpieces. According to the CBSE, the Examination results were earlier scheduled to be declared on 5 June 2015, but due to Supreme Court's stay order on declaration, the results were not announced.  The Supreme Court had asked Haryana Police to investigate the matter and identify the beneficiaries as soon as possible.  Approximately 6.3 lakh students had appeared for the examination which was conducted on 3 May 2015.  Later, the results were rescheduled to be declared on June 12, 2015. On 15 June 2015 the Supreme Court asked CBSE to re-conduct the AIPMT 2015 Exam within 4 weeks (by 12 July 2015).  After a hearing on the pleas of CBSE, Supreme Court had decided to re-conduct exam on 25 July 2015.  The exam was conducted safely and successfully across the country on the scheduled date (25 July 2015).  The result of Re-AIPMT was declared on 17 August 2015.

See also 
The National Council for Human Resource in Health in India
Health in India

References

External links
 Official website

Standardised tests in India
Medical education in India
Entrance examinations
Year of establishment missing